Gravity at Last is the second studio album by German singer and songwriter Ayọ, released on 26 September 2008 by Polydor Records. The album was recorded in March 2008 and, like her debut album, Joyful, within five days under live conditions. The recording in analog technology took place at Compass Point Studios in Nassau on the island of New Providence, Bahamas. The album topped the French chart in its second week on the run. On 5 February 2009, the album was certified platinum by the Syndicat National de l'Édition Phonographique (SNEP), denoting sales in excess of 200,000 copies in France.

The song "Slow Slow (Run Run)" was released for radio promotion on 30 June 2008 and was released as first single from the album. "Lonely" was released as the second single.

Track listing

Personnel

 Ayọ – vocals, acoustic guitar, backing vocals, electric guitar, piano, production
 Jawara Adams – trumpet
 Jean-Philippe Allard – executive production
 Sherrod "Licspiffy" Barnes – acoustic guitar, backing vocals, baritone guitar, electric guitar, guitar solo
 Osie Bowe – second engineer
 Larry Campbell – acoustic guitar, cittern, electric guitar, mandolin, National resonator guitar, pedal steel guitar, slide electric guitar, violin
 Keith Christopher – bass
 The Compass Point Horns – trumpet
 Dave Eggar – cello
 Don Harris – trumpet
 Jerry Lawson – vocals
 Andy Manganello – engineering
 Terry Manning – horn arrangements
 Ozzie Melendez – trombone
 Jay Newland – production, engineering, mixing
 Samanta Novella – artwork
 Jermaine Parrish – drums
 Lucky Peterson – backing vocals, clavinet, Hammond B3, piano, Wurlitzer electric piano
 Tino "Sheep" Richardson – tenor saxophone
 John Scarpulla – tenor saxophone
 Neil Symonette – percussion

Charts

Weekly charts

Year-end charts

Certifications

Release history

Notes

References

External links
 Video and info about the making of the album

2008 albums
Ayọ albums
Polydor Records albums